Mária Sulyok (1908–1987) was a Hungarian actress best known for her role in A köszívü ember fiai (1965) and Love, Emilia (1968).
She was born on 24 April 1908 and died on 20 October 1987 in Budapest, Hungary.

Selected filmography
 Ördöglovas (1944)
 Mickey Magnate (1949)
 Gázolás (1955)
 A Glass of Beer (1955)
 A köszívü ember fiai (1965)
 Story of My Foolishness (1966)
 Kárpáthy Zoltán (1966)
 Love, Emilia (1968)
 Mrs. Dery Where Are You? (1975)
 Yerma (1984)

External links

1908 births
1987 deaths
Hungarian film actresses
Hungarian stage actresses
20th-century Hungarian actresses